Francisco de Paula Urrutia Ordoñez (2 April 1827 — 12 September 1893) was a Colombian expatriate businessman living in Quito who served as 8th Envoy Extraordinary and Minister Plenipotentiary ad honorem of Colombia to Ecuador from 1889 to his death in 1893.

Personal life
Born on 2 April 1827 to Manuel José Urrutia y Quijano and Joaquina Ordóñez Balcázar in Popayán, during the period known as the Gran Colombia. On 14 April 1958 he married Dolores Olano Hurtado in Popayán, and out this union his son Francisco José was born. He was forced to leave Colombia with his family for Ecuador during the Colombian Civil War of 1876, where he remained afterwards.

References

1827 births
1893 deaths
People from Cauca Department
Francisco De Paula
Ambassadors of Colombia to Ecuador